Steve Dixon better known by his stage name Stig of the Dump, is an English rapper from Newcastle upon Tyne, who built a reputation as a battle rapper in London.  He lived in Spain for many years but has now returned to the United Kingdom.

Career
Stig's first major release was The Homeless Microphonist EP in 2006, followed by the Braindead 12", which featured RA the Rugged Man. He released his first full-length album, Mood Swings, in 2010. He is signed to Lewis Recordings.

Stig is a regular on the battle-rap circuits; his titles so far include two World End of the Weak Challenge Champion of Champions, two UK End of the Weak Challenge Champion, UK Battlescars Champion and Jump Off Tag Team Champion. He also gained notoriety for his impromptu battle with Asher D, at the film premiere of Life and Lyrics in 2006. He has also appeared as a judge on Don't Flop.

Discography
 The Homeless Microphonist EP (2006, Beer & Rap)
 "Braindead" 12", featuring RA the Rugged Man (2007, Beer & Rap)
 I Got Game CD single (2010, Lewis Recordings)
 Mood Swings LP (2010, Lewis Recordings)
 "Cannon Fodder EP" (2012, Lewis Recordings)
 "Record 1" (2013, Lewis Recordings)
 Kubrick (2015 Lewis Recordings)

Collaboration albums
 "Project Goon" - Legion of Goon (2017, Lewis Recordings)

See also
Stig of the Dump - 1963 children's novel

References

External links
 
 Stig of the Dump official website

Year of birth missing (living people)
Place of birth missing (living people)
20th-century births
20th-century English singers
21st-century English singers
Dubstep musicians
Living people
Musicians from Newcastle upon Tyne
English male rappers
20th-century British male singers
21st-century British male singers